Mat-Su Regional Medical Center is a 125-bed general hospital in the U.S. state of Alaska.  The hospital is owned by Community Health Systems (CHS).  Located in the Gateway census-designated place, between Palmer and Wasilla, it is the principal hospital for the Matanuska-Susitna Borough.  Owing to its location a short distance from the interchange of the Glenn and Parks Highways, Mat-Su Regional (along with the hospital on Joint Base Elmendorf-Richardson for those eligible to receive care there) serves as a principal hospital for many of the Glenn Highway communities in northern Anchorage, such as Chugiak, Eagle River, Eklutna and Peters Creek.

Built at a cost of $87,700,000 to replace the aging Valley Hospital in downtown Palmer, construction on the hospital began in spring 2004.  The hospital opened on January 27, 2006.  The three-story,  facility contains fifty medical/surgical beds and eight each of intensive care, progressive care, and obstetric beds, all in private rooms. There are four operating rooms, plus a fifth designated for Caesarean sections. The unfinished third floor provides room for a sixth operating room and 52 more general beds.

Mat-Su Regional also operates a large outpatient clinic on the edge of downtown Wasilla, next to Wasilla High School.

In 2008, Sarah Palin, then the governor of Alaska (and future Republican vice-presidential nominee), gave birth to her son Trig at Mat-Su Regional.

References

2006 establishments in Alaska
Hospital buildings completed in 2006
Buildings and structures in Matanuska-Susitna Borough, Alaska
Hospitals in Alaska
Community Health Systems